Kondraal Paavam is 2023 Indian Tamil-language crime thriller Drama ,film written and directed by Dayal Padmanabhan, and produced by Pratap Krishna and Manoj Kumar under, Einfach Studios. It features Varalaxmi Sarathkumar, Santhosh Prathap, Easwari Rao and Charle in the lead roles. It was released on 10 March 2023. The film is a remake of director's own Kannada film Aa Karaala Ratri wich itself is based on a Kannada play by Mohan Habbu which was translated from the tragic English play  Lithuania by Rupert Brooke.

Cast

Production 
The shooting of the film began on 28 October 2022. The teaser of the film is was released by actress Samantha. The trailer of the film was released on 3 March 2023.

Reception 
The film was released on 10 March 2023 across Tamil Nadu. Critic Logesh Balachandran from Times of India gave 3 stars out of 5 stars and noted that " Though Kondraal Paavam has flaws, the intense characterization and the screenplay make it worth a watch." Dina Thanthi gave a mixture of reviews and said that "It is special that director Dayal Padmanabhan has directed the crime and thriller story without boring it. He has satisfied the fans by equally mixing all the feelings like sentiment, love, and betrayal." Chandhini R from New Indian express noted that " An effective suspense drama shouldered by compelling performances" and gave 3 stars out of 5 stars.

Zee news Critic noted "Each and every character carries the film Kondraal Paavam. The performances of the actors add strength to the story." Critic from Dinamalar gave 3 rating out of 5 ratings.

References

External links 

 

2023 films
2020s Tamil-language films
Tamil remakes of Kannada films
Indian thriller films